Quaternary Geochronology is a peer-reviewed scientific journal addressing methods and results in the dating of samples from the Quaternary Period.

External links 
 

Quaternary science journals
Elsevier academic journals
Bimonthly journals
English-language journals
Publications established in 2006